Arungal is a village in the Ariyalur taluk of Ariyalur district, Tamil Nadu, India.

Demographics 

 census, Arungal had a total population of 2868 with 1435 males and 1433 females.

References 

Villages in Ariyalur district